The , formerly known as Port of Tsuchizaki, is a seaport on the Sea of Japan coast of Akita Prefecture, to the west of the city center of Akita in the Tōhoku region of northern Honshū, Japan. The port has a total land area of 662.5 hectares.

History
In 727 the envoys from Bokkai (Balhae) sailed the Sea of Japan and were calling at Akita Port for the first time. In the oldest Japanese marine law Kaisenshikimoku, Tsuchizaki Minato, former name of Akita Port, was referred to as the ten biggest ports in Japan. Tsuchizaki was just mentioned as "Minato (port)" in the Japanese historical references which suggests the  harbour was the port of all ports.
During the Edo period, Akita was an important port of call on the Kitamaebune route of coastal trade from Osaka to Hokkaido and an important source of revenue for the Satake clan’s Kubota Domain. In modern times, during the Meiji period a breakwater was completed in 1885 and enlarged in 1902, and Tsuchizakiko Port was designated a “secondary port” by the Japanese government in 1910. When the town of Tsuchizaki was annexed by the city of Akita in 1941, the port was officially renamed “Akita Port”. The port facilities were extensively damaged in American air raids on August 14, 1945.

Akita Port received the designation of “major port” from the Japanese government on January 19, 1951, and “special port” designation in 1962. A customs office was opened in 1964, permitting international trade. The Akita Northern Port extension was opened in 1970.

The Akita Offshore Wind Corporation has been implementing the first large-scale offshore wind power project on a commercial basis in Japan at Akita Port and Noshiro Port (both in Akita Prefecture).

Passenger terminal

It is located near the Nakajima pier.

Destination
Tomakomai
Niigata
Tsuruga

See also

Akita Port Tower Selion

External links
Ministry of Land, Infrastructure and Transport 
Akita Prefecture home page

References

Dewa Province
Transport in Akita City
Transport in Akita Prefecture
Akita
Buildings and structures in Akita Prefecture